PPMS can refer to:

 primary progressive multiple sclerosis
 Pilgrim Park Middle School, Wisconsin